Lacie Lyn Lybrand (born June 16, 1982) is an American model and beauty queen from Lexington, South Carolina, who was the winner of the Miss United States 2003 pageant, held in New York City. Lybrand won the Miss South Carolina USA 2006 title in the state pageant held in late 2005. This was her second attempt for the title as she had previously placed in the top ten at the 2005 event won by Sarah Medley.

Lybrand represented South Carolina in the Miss USA 2006 pageant that was broadcast live from Baltimore, Maryland on April 21, 2006. She placed in the top ten of the nationally televised pageant and competed in the swimsuit and evening gown events. The competition was won by Tara Conner of Kentucky.

Lybrand was also one of twenty-six Miss USA delegates who appeared on Deal or No Deal in April 2006.

Lybrand graduated from Lexington High School in 2000 and worked at SCANA, a public utility company, while still attending high school. She is a student at Midlands Technical College. Lybrand is a customer relations specialist and also pursues modeling. In 2006, she was selected to be the cover model for Supermodels Unlimited Magazine.

External links
Miss South Carolina USA website
Lacie Lybrand Photo Shoot with Carter Studios Inc.
Miss USA Official Profile

1982 births
Living people
Miss USA 2006 delegates
People from Lexington, South Carolina